The Fountain of Neptune (Spanish: Fuente de Neptuno) is a neoclassical fountain located in Madrid, Spain. The sculptural group in its centre represents Neptune, a Roman water deity.

History and description 
Designed by Ventura Rodríguez, the sculpture—made of white marble from Montesclaros—was commissioned to Juan Pascual de Mena. Sculptural works began in 1781. Following the master's death in April 1784, the fountain was finished in October 1786 by his disciples.

The fountain is formed by a circular pylon with the sculptural group in its centre. The crowned Roman god wields a trident with one hand while he grabs a sea snake with the other hand.

It has a maximum water capacity of 305 m3.

The fountain is the site where the Atlético Madrid's fans celebrate the team's trophies.

References 
Citations

Bibliography
 
 
 

Sculptures of Neptune
Fountains in Madrid
1786 sculptures
Horses in art
Paseo del Prado
Outdoor sculptures in Madrid
Neoclassical sculptures
Buildings and structures in Cortes neighborhood, Madrid